Hippocamelus is a genus of Cervidae, the deer family. It comprises two extant Andean and two fossil species. The living members are commonly known as the huemul (from the Mapuche language), and the taruca.

Both species have a stocky, thick, and short-legged body. They live at high altitudes in the summer, then move down the mountains in the fall and spend the winter in sheltered forested valleys. Areas with fresh water are preferred. They are herbivores that feed primarily on herbaceous plants and shrubs as well as sedges, lichens, and grasses found between the rocks on high peaks. They are active during daytime and have a lifespan of about ten years.

Extant species 
The huemul (Hippocamelus bisulcus), also known as the South Andean deer, is found in Chile and Argentina. Huemuls live in groups of varying size, typically of two or three individuals, but sometimes as many as eleven. In the past, groups of over a hundred deer were reported. Groups are made up of a female and her young, while males are often alone.

Huemul occur in several national parks in Chile and neighbouring parts of Argentina and have been on the Endangered list since 1996. They are endangered primarily due to human impacts such as deforestation, habitat fragmentation by roads, introduction of non-native mammals such as farm animals, and poaching.  They are in a classic "extinction spiral" marked by increasingly small, isolated populations.

The huemul is, along with the condor, the national animal of Chile.

The taruca (Hippocamelus antisensis), is found in Peru, as well as parts of Bolivia, and in treeless Puna grasslands. They live at high altitudes, from 2,500 to 5,200 meters above sea level. Social habits include grazing in flexible groups of up to thirty animals consisting of one or two males and several females.

Taxonomy and evolution 
In 2008, a genetic study indicated that the huemul and taruca may not be closely related, and that the taruca should therefore be placed in a separate genus. This has been contradicted by more recent studies.

Fossils belonging to the now extinct species Hippocamelus sulcatus have been identified from Brazil, Uruguay, and Argentina. This species inhabited lowland plains habitats, rather than mountains, and lived between 1.5 and 0.5 million years ago, during the mid to late Pleistocene. Its exact relationship to the living species is unclear. A second fossil species, Hippocamelus percultus, is known from the Bolivian Andes, and lived around 40,000 to 20,000 years ago; it may be a direct ancestor of the living taruca.

Conservation 
Both species are threatened according to the IUCN. The south Andean deer is endangered and the taruca is vulnerable.

References 

Capreolinae
Mammal genera
Mammals of Chile
Mammals of Argentina
Mammals described in 1816
Taxa named by Friedrich Sigismund Leuckart